Kovilangulam is a village located in Virudhunagar district of Tamil Nadu, India.

Demographics 
According to the 2011 Census of India, Kovilangulam had a population of 3,569 and a total area of 11.73 km2. Males and females constituted 48.95 per cent and 51.05 per cent respectively of the population.  Literacy at that time was 75 per cent. People classified as Scheduled Castes under India's system of positive discrimination accounted for 35.78 per cent of the population.

References 

Villages in Virudhunagar district